Grimheia is a mountainous area at Barentsøya, Svalbard. It extends over a length of about thirteen kilometers at the northern part of the island. East of the area is the valley of Grimdalen with the river of Grima.

References

Mountains of Svalbard
Barentsøya